The New York State Education Department (NYSED) divides the state into nine Joint Management Team (JMT) Regions, excluding New York City. Each JMT contains one or more Regional Information Centers (RIC), which contain one or more Boards of Cooperative Educational Services (BOCES), and each BOCES supports several school districts.

The table below is sorted by either the school district, number of students, county, BOCES, RIC and JMT. Some school districts are not part of BOCES; they are appended with "(not BOCES)".

See also
Boards of Cooperative Educational Services
List of high schools in New York
List of Long Island public school districts and schools
New York City DOE District 22, abolished in 2002

References

Sources
The list of school districts in each BOCES area is taken from the individual BOCES website.

New York State Education Department
School District Index for The NYS Administrators Listing 
List of New York School Districts websites
School Districts in New York State

School districts
New York
School districts
New York State Education Department